Sevilla FC Femenino is a Spanish women's football team, representing Sevilla FC.

History

Collaboration with CD Híspalis
In 2004 Sevilla FC signed a collaboration with local Superliga Femenina team CD Híspalis. While remaining an independent club, Híspalis played for the next three seasons in Sevilla FC's training facilities using its name, kit and badge. The team improved significantly and in 2006 it was the runner-up of the Superliga, losing what would have been their first title to RCD Espanyol on the goal average. Sevilla's Auxiliadora Jiménez was the season's top scorer.

Sevilla/Híspalis declined as fast as it emerged, and in 2008 it ended last in the table and relegated to the second tier.

Sevilla FC own team
Following the resulting relegation Sevilla FC broke with Híspalis and created their own women's team in 2008, beginning from the regional categories. In 2009 the team reached Primera Nacional, as it was then known Segunda División, but was instead promoted directly to the Superliga as RFEF decided to expand the category with women's sections of clubs from the male leagues.

Sevilla played two seasons in the Superliga before being relegated in 2011. The following year it returned to the top category after topping its group and beating Oiartzun KE and CD Femarguín in the promotion play-offs. They were relegated to the Segunda División at the end of the 2014–15 Primera División season before returning to the Primera División after the 2016–17 season.

Season to season

Players

Current squad

Reserve team

Notable players

References

Women's football clubs in Spain
Sevilla FC
Association football clubs established in 2008
2008 establishments in Spain
Primera División (women) clubs
Football clubs in Andalusia
Sport in Seville